Valen is a surname. Notable people with the surname include:

Anita Valen (born 1968), Norwegian cyclist
Fartein Valen (1887–1952), Norwegian composer and musical theorist
Henry Valen (1924–2007), Norwegian political scientist
Inge Valen (born 1951), Norwegian footballer
Kristian Valen (born 1974), Norwegian comedian and musician
Monica Valen (born 1970), Norwegian cyclist
Nancy Valen (born 1965), American actress and television producer
Neri Valen (1893–1954), Norwegian politician
Snorre Valen (born 1984), Norwegian musician and politician

Norwegian-language surnames